Brendon Neil Dawson (born Bulawayo, 2 September 1967) is a former Zimbabwean rugby union footballer and the former head coach for the Zimbabwe national rugby union team. He played as a flanker.

Dawson had 20 caps for Zimbabwe, from 1990 to 1998, scoring 3 tries, 14 points in aggregate. He was present at the 1991 Rugby World Cup, playing in all the three matches and scoring a try in 55-11 loss to Ireland.

He took over as head coach of Zimbabwe from Christopher Lampard in 2007 and was replaced in 2015 by Cyprian Madenge, his former assistant coach.

References

External links
Brendon Dawson International Statistics

1967 births
Living people
Sportspeople from Bulawayo
Zimbabwean rugby union players
Zimbabwean rugby union coaches
Rugby union flankers
White Zimbabwean sportspeople